The 2014 Total 24 Hours of Spa was the 66th running of the 24 Hours of Spa. It was also the fourth round of the 2014 Blancpain Endurance Series season and was held on 26 and 27 July at the Circuit de Spa-Francorchamps, Belgium. The race was won by the Belgian Laurens Vanthoor and the German duo of René Rast, and Markus Winkelhock of Belgian Audi Club Team WRT in their Audi R8 LMS ultra.

Race result
 All teams used Pirelli tyres.

Support races
Lamborghini Super Trofeo, Cooper Tires British Formula Three Championship, Formula Renault 2.0 Northern European Cup and Belgian Racing Car Championship + GT4 European Series.

References

 2014 Total 24 Hours of Spa – Blancpain GT Series Official website
 Total 24 Hours of Spa/Belgium Main Race result

Spa 24 Hours
Spa
Spa